This is a summary of the electoral history of Geoffrey Palmer, Prime Minister of New Zealand (1989–90), Leader of the Labour Party (1989–90), Member of Parliament for Christchurch Central (1979–90).

Parliamentary elections

1979 by-election

1981 election

1984 election

1987 election

Leadership elections

1983 Deputy-leadership election
First ballot

Second ballot

1989 Leadership election

Notes

References

Palmer, Geoffrey